Laura C. A. Rosella is a Canadian epidemiologist who is an Associate Professor at the Dalla Lana School of Public Health in the University of Toronto. She studies public health and the social determinants of health. Rosella holds a Canada Research Chair in Population Health Analytics.

Early life and education 
Rosella was an undergraduate student at the University of Toronto, where she majored in health science and epidemiology. She remained at the University for her graduate studies, where she evaluated public health risk in people with diabetes mellitus.

Research and career 
Rosella is a professor at the Dalla Lana School of Public Health at the University of Toronto. Rosella is Scientific Director of the Population Health Analytics Laboratory. She has looked to prevent diabetes, through regular screenings and partnerships with provincial health ministries. She developed DPoRT, a Diabetes Population Risk Tool which identifies the optimum cut offs for health screenings to prevent adverse medical outcomes. At the same time, Rosella investigates how people living with diabetes accumulate chronic conditions. She combines her understanding of social and behavioural risk factor data with an understanding of health care utilisation to eliminate persistent health inequalities.

In November 2020, Rosella joined the Institute for Better Health as the Stephen Family Research Chair in Community Health. In this capacity she looks to improve public health decision making and promote the equitable distribution of healthcare. Rosella has evaluated the use of machine learning in predicting population health. She found that the majority of machine learning applications only made use of traditional data sources, and rarely used big data.

Rosella served as a member of the Ontario COVID-19 Science Advisory Table as a part of the group's Modelling Consensus Table.

Awards and honours 
 Canadian Society for Epidemiology and Biostatistics Early Career Award
 Society for Epidemiologic Research Brian MacMahon Early Career Epidemiology Award
 Canada Top 40 Under 40
 Elected President of the Canadian Society for Epidemiology and Biostatistics

Selected publications

References 

Living people
Year of birth missing (living people)
Canadian women epidemiologists
Canadian diabetologists
University of Toronto alumni
Academic staff of the University of Toronto
Canada Research Chairs
Canadian women scientists
Ontario COVID-19 Science Advisory Table